The men's halfpipe event in snowboarding at the 2006 Winter Olympics was held in Bardonecchia, a village in the Province of Turin, Italy. Competition took place on 12 February 2006.

Medalists

Results
The halfpipe event for men took place on 12 February 2006, both the qualification rounds and the finals taking place on that day. Forty-four snowboarders took part in the qualification, the top twelve of whom move on to the finals.

In the qualification round, each snowboarder was given two runs to be in the top six of that run. Regardless of how many points the person received, as long as they placed in the top six, they advanced to the finals. If the person qualified in the first run, they did not need to do a second run in the qualification. Shaun White, the gold medalist for this event, came in seventh place after the first run, requiring him to compete again in the second run, where he recorded the highest score of the event to that point. The finals proceeded in a similar fashion. The twelve qualifiers had two runs in which to score the highest possible points. The snowboarders were ranked by their highest score, and medals were awarded accordingly. The following is a table detailing the results of the qualification and finals runs of the competing snowboarders.

References

Snowboarding at the 2006 Winter Olympics
Men's events at the 2006 Winter Olympics